The report Metal Stocks in Society: Scientific Synthesis was the first of six scientific assessments on global metals to be published by the International Resource Panel (IRP) of the United Nations Environment Programme. The IRP provides independent scientific assessments and expert advice on a variety of areas, including:
 the volume of selected raw material reserves and how efficiently these resources are being used
 the lifecycle-long environmental impacts of products and services created and consumed around the globe
 options to meet human and economic needs with fewer or cleaner resources.

About the report
Metals were an early priority for the International Resource Panel, since little was known about them, their impacts, their economic importance or their scarcity. The report aimed to calculate the amount of metals present in society and assess the potential for utilising in-use stock to offset demand from virgin metal. Knowing how much metal stock there is in use, and how long the lifespan of the metal is, can help planners know when these metal stocks will enter recycling or waste streams.  It suggested that these 'mines above ground' had growing potential for future metals supply; the authors found that there is about 50 kg of above-ground copper for every person on earth, and more than two tons of iron per capita. However, they noted that enormous disparities in global metals stocks existed between developed and developing nations including Brazil, China and India.

Calculating ‘anthropogenic stocks’ of metals already in use in society is a precursor to stimulating efforts to increase recycling. The authors reported that very little information is presently known about different metals, making it difficult for policy makers to develop and plan recycling systems. However, what is known is that recycling can not only reduce negative impacts on the environment but also save energy. For example, 95% of the energy used to make aluminium from bauxite ore is saved by using recycled material.

The authors quantified per capita stocks of the following metals, for some countries (stocks were mostly quantified for developed countries but data was also available for some developing nations).
 Major engineering metals: aluminium, copper, iron, lead, steel, stainless steel, zinc
 Precious metals: gold, palladium, platinum, rhodium, silver
 Specialty metals: antimony, cadmium, chromium, cobalt, magnesium, manganese, mercury, molybdenum, nickel, tin, titanium, tungsten

Extant in-use metal-stock estimations for the major engineering metals:

Reasons for recycling
Some primary stocks of rare but useful metals are already running low. For example, rhenium only occurs at seven parts per billion in the Earth’s crust, making it one of the rarest elements on the planet. However, its high melting point of 3,186 °C makes it valuable in the manufacture of jet engines. Demand for the metal is rising, with increasing air travel, but its rarity means increasing extraction is not simple. This is where recycling comes in; rhenium is one of the few metals that has witnessed a rise in recycling rates. It is likely that recycling will become a more viable option than extraction for other metals in future, saving energy, cutting greenhouse gases emitted to the atmosphere and reducing negative impacts on the environment.

References

External links 
 www.resourcepanel.org
 www.unep.org

United Nations Environment Programme
Recycling
Metals